Salix nuristanica is a species of willow which was described by A.K.Skvortsov in 1965.

Range
Salix nuristanica is found in Afghanistan and northern Pakistan.

References 

nuristanica